The 2014 Jalisco Open was a professional tennis tournament played on hard courts. It was the fourth edition of the tournament which was part of the 2014 ATP Challenger Tour. It took place in Guadalajara, Mexico between 25 and 30 March 2014.

Singles main-draw entrants

Seeds

 1 Rankings are as of March 17, 2014.

Other entrants
The following players received wildcards into the singles main draw:
  Lucas Gómez
  Eduardo Yahir Orozco Rangel
  César Ramírez
  Miguel Ángel Reyes-Varela

The following players gained entry into the singles main draw as a special exempt:
  Samuel Groth
  Ante Pavić

The following players gained entry into the singles main draw as an alternate:
  Hiroki Moriya
  Andrea Arnaboldi

The following players received entry from the qualifying draw:
  Gilles Müller
  Takanyi Garanganga
  Agustín Velotti
  Marcelo Arévalo

Champions

Singles

 Gilles Müller def.  Denis Kudla, 6–2, 6–2

Doubles

 César Ramírez /  Miguel Ángel Reyes-Varela def.  Andre Begemann /  Matthew Ebden, 6–4, 6–2

External links
Official Website 

Jalisco Open
Jalisco Open
2014 in Mexican tennis